The name Chevalier Saint-George can refer to
Chevalier de Saint-Georges, the first European composer of African descent.
James Francis Edward Stuart, "the pretender"